Béla Szászy (26 November 1865 – 17 June 1931) was a Hungarian politician and jurist, who served as acting Minister of Justice in 1919.

References
 Magyar Életrajzi Lexikon

1865 births
1931 deaths
Justice ministers of Hungary